Ashutosh Sharma (born 15 September 1998) is an Indian cricketer. He made his Twenty20 debut for Madhya Pradesh in the 2017–18 Zonal T20 League on 12 January 2018. He made his List A debut on 16 October 2019, for Madhya Pradesh in the 2019–20 Vijay Hazare Trophy.

References

External links
 

1998 births
Living people
Indian cricketers
Madhya Pradesh cricketers
People from Ratlam